Patty Sonnekson (1927 - December 18, 1951) was an American figure skater.  She competed in pairs and won the bronze medals at the 1946 U.S. Figure Skating Championships with partner Charles Brinkman.

Sonnekson married Richard E. Pfeiffer. She died in 1951 following surgery.

Results
(Pairs with Brinkman)

References

1927 births
1951 deaths
American female pair skaters
20th-century American women